Diwan Chand Chawla is a Pakistani politician who had been a Member of the Provincial Assembly of Sindh, from June 2013 to May 2018.

Early life and education 
He was born on 14 April 1961 in Sukkur.

He has done Bachelor of Science from Sindh University.

Political career

He was elected to the Provincial Assembly of Sindh as a candidate of Muttahida Qaumi Movement on reserved seat for minorities in 2013 Pakistani general election.

References

Living people
Sindh MPAs 2013–2018
Muttahida Qaumi Movement politicians
1961 births